Paul J. Jennings (March 19, 1918 – September 7, 1987) was an American labor leader who served as president of the International Union of Electrical Workers (IUE) from 1965 to 1976.

Life and career
Jennings was born in Brooklyn, New York. He attended James Madison High School, the RCA Institute and the Crown Heights Labor School.

He was the successor to founding president James B. Carey. Among his successes were formation of a 13-union committee created for collective bargaining with General Electric and Westinghouse. His attempts to stop Richard Nixon's re-election as president landed him on the master list of Nixon political opponents.

Jennings died in West Hempstead, New York following a long illness. The IUE's Paul Jennings Scholarship is named in his honor.

References

External links
The IUE Labor Archives Project  via Rutgers University

1918 births
1987 deaths
People from Brooklyn
People from West Hempstead, New York
Activists from New York (state)
James Madison High School (Brooklyn) alumni
American trade union leaders